Berberis fendleri, commonly known as Colorado barberry, is a shrub native to canyons and mountain slopes in the western United States (Colorado, New Mexico, and Utah).

Berberis fendleri is up to 2 m (7 feet) tall, and has simple deciduous leaves up to 4.6 cm (1.8 inches) long. Flowers are borne in racemes of up to 15 flowers, each producing a red, juicy, oblong fruit up to 8 mm long.

References

fendleri
Edible plants
Flora of the Southwestern United States
Plants described in 1849